Ericameria nauseosa (formerly Chrysothamnus nauseosus), commonly known as Chamisa, rubber rabbitbrush, and gray rabbitbrush, is a shrub in the sunflower family (Aster) found in the arid regions of western North America.

Two subspecies have been described, consimilis (the green form with 8 varieties) and nauseosa (the gray form with 14 varieties).

Description
Both the flexible (rubbery) stems and the leaves are greenish-gray with a soft felt-like covering.

It blooms from August to October and produces pungent-smelling, golden-yellow flowers. The shrub reproduces from seeds and root sprouts.

Taxonomy
Rubber rabbitbrush was moved from the genus Chrysothamnus to the genus Ericameria in a 1993 paper. The findings of a 2003 phylogenetic investigation of Ericameria were consistent with the move of the species to Ericameria.  The second edition of the Jepson plant manual and the United States Department of Agriculture's Germplasm Resources Information Network have adopted the name Ericameria nauseosa.

The specific epithet means 'heavy scented'.

Subspecies and varieties 
Recognized infraspecific taxa from The Plant List with distribution information from Flora of North America and Tropicos
 Ericameria nauseosa subsp. consimilis (Greene) G.L.Nesom & G.I.Baird  (green form)
 Ericameria nauseosa var. arenaria (L.C.Anderson) G.L.Nesom & G.I.Baird – sandstone in Arizona, New Mexico, Utah
 Ericameria nauseosa var. arta (A.Nelson) G.L.Nesom & G.I.Baird – Idaho, Oregon
 Ericameria nauseosa var. ceruminosa (Durand & Hilg.) G.L.Nesom & G.I.Baird – gravelly arroyos in Mohave Desert of California
 Ericameria nauseosa var. juncea (Greene) G.L.Nesom & G.I.Baird – Utah
 Ericameria nauseosa var. leiosperma (A.Gray) G.L.Nesom & G.I.Baird – sandy + rocky sites in Arizona, California, Colorado, Nevada, Utah
 Ericameria nauseosa var. mohavensis (Greene) G.L.Nesom & G.I.Baird – scrublands in California, Nevada
 Ericameria nauseosa var. nitida (L.C.Anderson) G.L.Nesom & G.I.Baird – dry streambeds in Arizona, New Mexico, Utah
 Ericameria nauseosa var. turbinata (M.E.Jones) G.L.Nesom & G.I.Baird – sand dunes in Arizona, Nevada, Utah 
 Ericameria nauseosa subsp. nauseosa (gray form)
 Ericameria nauseosa var. ammophila L.C.Anderson – Colorado
 Ericameria nauseosa var. bernardina (H.M.Hall) G.L.Nesom & G.I.Baird – open pine forests in California; Baja California
 Ericameria nauseosa var. bigelovii (A.Gray) G.L.Nesom & G.I.Baird – dry slopes in Arizona, Colorado, New Mexico, Utah
 Ericameria nauseosa var. graveolens (Nutt.) Reveal & Schuyler – plains in Sask.; Arizona, Colorado, Idaho, Kansas, Montana, Nebraska, Nevada, New Mexico, Dakotas, Oklahoma, Texas, Utah, Wyoming
 Ericameria nauseosa var. hololeuca (A.Gray) G.L.Nesom & G.I.Baird – slopes in Arizona, California, Idaho, Nevada, New Mexico, Oregon, Utah
 Ericameria nauseosa var. iridis (L.C.Anderson) G.L.Nesom & G.I.Baird – steep, barren slopes in Sevier County in Utah
 Ericameria nauseosa var. latisquamea (A.Gray) G.L.Nesom & G.I.Baird 	- dry streambeds in Arizona, New Mexico; Baja California, Sonora
 Ericameria nauseosa var. nana (Cronquist) G.L.Nesom & G.I.Baird – ridges and cliffs in Idaho, Oregon, Washington
 Ericameria nauseosa var. nauseosa – plains + hills in Alberta, Saskatchewan; Colorado, Idaho, Montana, Nebraska, Dakotas., Wyoming
 Ericameria nauseosa var. oreophila (A.Nelson) G.L.Nesom & G.I.Baird – Arizona, California, Colorado, Idaho, Montana, Nevada, New Mexico, Oregon, Utah, Wyoming, Baja California
 Ericameria nauseosa var. psilocarpa (S.F.Blake) G.L.Nesom & G.I.Baird – sagebrush scrub in eastern Utah
 Ericameria nauseosa var. salicifolia (Rydb.) G.L.Nesom & G.I.Baird – brushlands in Utah
 Ericameria nauseosa var. speciosa (Nutt.) G.L.Nesom & G.I.Baird  – brush + open woodlands in Alberta, British Columbia, California, Colorado, Idaho, Montana, Nevada, Oregon, Utah, Washington, Wyoming
 Ericameria nauseosa var. texensis (L.C.Anderson) G.L.Nesom & G.I.Baird – Guadalupe Mountains in Texas + New Mexico
 Ericameria nauseosa var. washoensis (L.C.Anderson) G.L.Nesom & G.I.Baird – open rocky sites in grasslands of northeastern California and northwestern Nevada

Distribution and habitat
It grows in the arid regions of western Canada, western United States (from the western Great Plains to the Pacific) and northern Mexico.

Ecology
Along with associated species, like big sage and western wheat grass, rubber rabbitbrush is a significant source of food for browsing wildlife (including game animals and rabbits) on winter ranges. Dense stands of this species often grow on poorly managed rangelands, in disturbed areas along roadways and on abandoned agricultural property.

The species often occurs with Chrysothamnus viscidiflorus.

Cultivation
Rabbitbrush, Ericameria nauseosa, has gained popularity as an ornamental xeriscaping shrub in areas where water conservation is important. It thrives in a wide range of coarse, alkaline soils that are common to desert environments. Pruning the shrub back to several inches in early spring, before new growth begins, may help improve the shrub's ornamental value.

Radioactivity 
Specimens growing in Bayo Canyon, near Los Alamos, New Mexico, exhibit a concentration of radioactive strontium-90 300,000 times higher than a normal plant. Their roots reach into a closed nuclear waste treatment area, mistaking strontium for calcium due to its similar chemical properties. According to Joseph Masco, the radioactive shrubs are "indistinguishable from other shrubs without a Geiger counter."

Uses 
The Zuni people use the blossoms  bigelovii variety of the nauseosa subspecies to make a yellow dye. They use the stems to make baskets. The Navajo also made a yellow dye from some of the flower heads.

Possible commercial uses
Rubber rabbitbrush was considered as a source of rubber as early as 1904. Several studies have been conducted on the possible use of rubber rabbitbrush as a source of rubber including ones during World Wars I and II, and in 1987. Between 2005 and 2008, the University of Nevada researched possible material applications of rubber rabbitbrush. One possible commercial use of the species would be as a source for hypoallergenic rubber for use in products designed for people with latex allergies.

Gallery

References

External links

 United States Department of Agribulture Profile:  Ericameria nauseosa
  Jepson Manual – Ericameria nauseosa
  Ericameria nauseosa Calflora Photo Gallery, University of California
  Ericameria nauseosa  Oregon Flora Image Project
 https://www.fs.fed.us/wildflowers/plant-of-the-week/ericameria_nauseosa.shtml

nauseo
Fiber plants
Flora of Northwestern Mexico
Flora of the Northwestern United States
Flora of the Southwestern United States
Flora of Western Canada
Natural history of the California chaparral and woodlands
Natural history of the Peninsular Ranges
Plant dyes
Garden plants of North America
Drought-tolerant plants
Flora without expected TNC conservation status